Kinatay ( or ) is a 2009 thriller film directed by Brillante Mendoza and written by Armando Lao. The story is centered on a criminology student (Coco Martin) who accidentally joins a syndicate to make enough money for his family, and gets involved in murder and dismembering of an erring drug dealer.

The film premiered at the 62nd Cannes Film Festival, where it won the Best Director Award, the first Filipino film to do so, although the film was notorious for being critically panned by critics including Roger Ebert. The film was included in the 2009 Cinemalaya Film Festival.

Plot
Newly-wedded Criminology student Peping receives a text message from his friend Abyong. He says they need to meet at Luneta Park that night. At the park, Peping passes to Abyong drug money collected by a balut vendor, but Abyong informs Peping that Kap (or Vic) requires his presence for another "operation". Peping reluctantly agrees and they enter a van parked nearby. He asks Abyong what they are up to but Abyong offers little details.

They stop by a night club and Sarge calls for Madonna (or Gina), claiming Kap wants to see her in the van. Inside the van, Madonna gives an alibi to Kap about a certain Franco but is abruptly beaten and restrained with duct tape. As the van is about to enter the NLEX tollway, Kap calls an unidentified boss who orders them to put down Madonna. Sarge and Chico beat her unconscious and the group believes she is dead. At the expressway, a police car is in pursuit but eventually overtakes and arrests another driver.

They stop at an isolated house in a rural town and transport Madonna's body to the basement. Sarge throws a bucket of water to find Madonna still alive. Outside, Peping learns from Abyong that Madonna had a debt of more than  worth of drugs. Kap orders him, Abyong and Rommel to buy food and liquor, as the unidentified boss ('Gen') still has a meeting. Inside the van, Abyong tells Peping he also felt nervous for the first time, and hands over to Peping a licensed gun; a gift from Kap and the "cure for nervousness". As they stop by a local store and buy liquor, Rommel tells Peping to buy balut from the nearby bus station. Peping buys but lingers around the area, eventually entering a bus bound to depart. His phone rings so he makes an alibi of urinating and returns to the van.

Back at the house, Kap orders Peping to call for Sarge. Sarge leaves Madonna to Peping, who discovers she has a child. Kap receives a call from the unidentified boss implying that it is time. The men enter the basement room and remove the duct tape from her mouth. Madonna asks for forgiveness from Kap but Kap insists that "business is business" and leaves the room. Sarge begins beating her, but Chico stops him short and says he wants to "do something" first. Outside, as Kap and Peping have a conversation, Chico rapes Madonna, whose cries are heard by Peping. Sarge tells Abyong and Chico to find a bolo knife. Madonna is restrained and Sarge gives the order to Chico, who stabs her twice in the torso, killing her.
Chico chops off one leg as Peping watches in horror. Peping is told to find a sack. Sarge is annoyed by the blunt bolo knife and tells Abyong to find a sharp kitchen knife, which he uses to sever the head. Sarge takes off his bloody shirt and washes in the nearby bathroom. The men transport the
dismembered body parts to the van and clean up the blood evidence in the room.

Inside the van, the men indiscriminately toss out the body parts at different places along the way. They stop by a local eatery and order food. Peping enters the eatery bathroom and throws up realizing what had just transpired. He heads back to his seat and says he had lost his appetite. He asks
Kap if he can leave. Kap tells him that he will get used to it, and hands him some money for his baby's milk. A news reporter is seen interviewing residents about a severed head found in a garbage dump. Peping rides a taxi home as his wife Cecille prepares some breakfast while carrying the baby.

Cast
 Coco Martin as Peping
 John Regala as Sarge
 Maria Isabel Lopez as Madonna/Gina
 Jhong Hilario as Abyong
 Julio Diaz as Vic/Kap
 Mercedes Cabral as Cecille
 Lauren Novero as Chico
 Benjie Filomeno as Rommel
 Allan Paule as Leo

Reception
The review aggregation website Rotten Tomatoes offers a score of 71% from seven critics, and a rating average of 5.9 out of 10. Roger Ebert of the Chicago Sun-Times had been one of the film's most notable detractors, writing: "Here is a film that forces me to apologize to Vincent Gallo for calling The Brown Bunny the worst film in the history of the Cannes Film Festival."

Awards
62nd Cannes Film Festival
Prix de la Mise en Scene (winner)
Palme d'Or (nominated)
Sitges International Film Festival
Best Director (winner)
Best Original Soundtrack (winner)
33rd Gawad Urian na Manunuri ng Pelikulang Pilipino (2010)
Pinakamahusay na Pelikula (Best Film) - winner
Pinakamahusay na Direksiyon (Best Director) - winner
Pinakamahusay na Tunog (Best Sound) - winner
7th Golden Screen Award (2010)
Best Actor (Coco Martin) - winner
Best Supporting Actress (Ma. Isabel Lopez) - winner
Best Director (winner)
Gawad Tanglaw (2009)
Best Film - winner
Best Director (Brillante Mendoza) - winner
Best Supporting Actress (Ma. Isabel Lopez) - winner
Presidential Jury Award for Excellence in Acting (Coco Martin) - winner

References

External links

2009 films
Filipino-language films
2009 drama films
2009 thriller films
2000s thriller films
2000s psychological drama films
Films directed by Brillante Mendoza
Philippine psychological drama films
Philippine thriller films
Philippine thriller drama films
Psychological drama films
Cannes Film Festival Award for Best Director winners